The 2020–21 Dynamo Moscow season was the club's 98th season and fourth season back in the Russian Premier League, following their relegation at the end of the 2015–16 season. Dynamo Moscow finished the season in 7th place and where knocked out of the Russian Cup by Krylia Sovetov in the Quarterfinals and the UEFA Europa League by Locomotive Tbilisi at the Second Qualifying Round stage.

Season events
On 3 August, Dynamo announced the signing of Daniil Fomin from Ufa. The following day, 4 August, Dynamo announced that they had activated the clause in their loan deal with Ufa to make Sylvester Igboun's transfer permanent.

On 17 August, Dynamo announced the signing of Nikola Moro from Dinamo Zagreb.

On 7 September, Dynamo announced the signing of Daniil Lesovoy from Arsenal Tula.

On 29 September, Kirill Novikov resigned as manager, with Alyaksandr Kulchy being appointed as caretaker manager. On 14 October, Sandro Schwarz was appointed as Dynamo's new permanent manager, with ex-Dynamo forward Andriy Voronin joining as an assistant coach.

On 15 October, Dynamo Moscow re-signed Roman Neustädter on a contract until the end of the season, after the defender had previously left the club when his contract expired at the end of the previous season. Two days later, 17 October, Guillermo Varela joined on loan for the remainder of the season from Copenhagen.

Squad

Out on loan

Transfers

In

Loans in

Out

Loans out

Released

Friendlies

Competitions

Overview

Premier League

Results summary

Results by round

Results

League table

Russian Cup

UEFA Europa League

Qualifying rounds

Squad statistics

Appearances and goals

|-
|colspan="14"|Players away from the club on loan:

|-
|colspan="14"|Players who appeared for Dynamo Moscow but left during the season:

|}

Goal scorers

Clean sheets

Disciplinary record

References

FC Dynamo Moscow seasons
Dynamo Moscow
Dynamo Moscow